Lengerich is a Samtgemeinde in the district Emsland in Lower Saxony, Germany. Its seat is in the municipality Lengerich.

The Samtgemeinde Lengerich consists of the following municipalities:

 Bawinkel 
 Gersten 
 Handrup
 Langen
 Lengerich
 Wettrup

Gallery 

Samtgemeinden in Lower Saxony